Jessica Gagnon McClintock (June 19, 1930 – February 16, 2021) was founder, President and CEO of Jessica McClintock, Inc., an American retail company based in San Francisco, California. She was a designer of formal dress gowns. In 2013, after 43 years in fashion, Jessica changed her business strategy from designing and company owned retail stores to a Jessica McClintock master brand model. Up to her death in 2021, she directed the overall direction and execution of her brand through leading category licensees.

Early life 
McClintock was born as Jessica Gagnon in Presque Isle, Maine on June 19, 1930. Growing up in the state of Maine, McClintock's father was a shoe salesman, and her mother was a beautician. When McClintock told her mother of her dream of designing dresses, her mother encouraged McClintock to use her creative side. Using skills she learned at an early age from her grandmother (artist Verna Hedrick) once she began her career, McClintock made a name in fashion quickly. McClintock attended Boston University from 1947 to 1949.

Personal life and death 
McClintock attended Boston University from 1947 to 1949. At age 19, McClintock quit Boston University to marry Al Staples, an engineering student at MIT. Shortly after her marriage, McClintock obtained her Bachelor of Arts degree from San Jose State University in California.

In 1963, Al Staples died in an automobile accident. This led to a second marriage, to airplane pilot Fred McClintock, who was a friend of her husband. This marriage shortly ended in a divorce in 1967. Jessica McClintock was a school teacher in Marblehead, Massachusetts, 1966–68 and Long Island, New York, 1968. After the divorce, McClintock and her son Scott moved to San Francisco, California. McClintock continued her career as a school teacher at Nimitz Elementary School in Sunnyvale, California, 1964–65 and 1968–69.

For the last 20 years of her life, McClintock enjoyed sharing the fashion business with the niece who shared her namesake, Jessica (now Jessica Souza), and grand niece, Madelyn Souza, for whom she was encouraging a career in fashion when McClintock died of natural causes on February 16, 2021, aged 90, in San Francisco.

Career 
While living in San Francisco, in 1969 McClintock met Eleanor Bailey, who was the head of design and production and looking for investors for Gunne Sax Company, a local dress store. In 1970, McClintock invested $5,000 from her savings and became partners with Bailey, directly in charge of the designing and marketing of the new dress line. Bailey stepped down, leaving McClintock the sole owner of Gunne Sax.

McClintock started with a single-line clothing company and expanded it into a multifaceted outlet targeting international customers looking to purchase bridal, junior and children's designer clothing. McClintock's main design focus was on "romance." Her designs sold worldwide, including regions such as the Middle East, Asia and Europe. In 1979, two new clothing lines were created: One was to target girls with the Gunne Sax line, and the other was a secondary contemporary line under the McClintock name/label. Since these two lines became a success, McClintock was able to open her own retail stores. The first Jessica McClintock store was opened in San Francisco in 1981. A year later, Jessica's son, Scott McClintock, joined the company and made two clothing lines that were manufactured under labels of Scott McClintock Dresses and Scott McClintock Sport. In 1987, Jessica McClintock renamed Gunne Sax as Jessica McClintock. She also added sleepwear lines and her fragrance line. By the mid-90s, McClintock had opened a total of 41 boutiques with reported annual sales of $100 million, and her dresses were sold in department stores in the U.S and other countries. She made her company a family affair with her brother, Jack Hedrich, as vice president of the company, and Bruce Hutchins, her cousin, in charge of the McClintock boutiques. Her niece, Jessica Hutchins, was responsible for the bridal wear line.

Fragrance line 
McClintock developed her first fragrance line in 1988. The perfume was called Jessica McClintock and became one of the top-selling fragrances in the U.S. Her second fragrance, Jess, went on sale in 1995. McClintock also introduced a men's fragrance called Scott McClintock, which was sold exclusively at her boutiques. In the summer of 2001, McClintock came out with another fragrance called Jessica McClintock Number 3 and, in the spring of 2003, she launched three Gunne Sax fragrances called Jasmine Kiss, Vintage Vanilla, and Raspberry Romance. Other scents in the brand include New Victorian, Gunne Sax and Jessica McClintock Silk Ribbons, which is a bridal-inspired fragrance. McClintock's perfumes are still sold online and in stores, including Walgreens, Target, Perfume Euphorium, Perfume Mart, KMart, Macy's, TJ Maxx, FragranceON, Perfume Blvd, and www.JMCfragrance.com.

Controversy 
From 1993 to 1996, the garment workers' association Asian Immigrant Women Advocates (AIWA) organised a campaign to draw attention to the poor labor practices of McClintock's subcontractors. AIWA called for a boycott of the MClintock company. The boycott stopped in 1996 after both parties reached an agreement as McClintock provided resources for workers such as a garment workers education fund.

Change in strategy 
After spending over 40 years creating satin, silk and tulle gowns, fragrances and other products, McClintock shifted her role with the company at the age of 83 to the oversight of the Jessica McClintock master brand licensing business. With the closing of the designer's stores, outlets, and online store by November 2013, her company transitioned to a full licensing model with the company growing through leading category licensees.

Today the Jessica McClintock brand offers fragrance, handbags, fashion jewelry, eyewear, fashion accessories, and home products. Destination bridal is being introduced for Autumn 2019, and prom for Spring 2020 with other special occasion and eveningwear categories following in 2020. The brand is actively seeking additional product categories for its business.

Awards and achievements 
1981 Ernie Award, 1985 Best California Designers Award, 1986 Tommy Award, American Printed Fabric Council, 1988 Press Appreciation Award, 1989 Merit Award Design, 1996 Tommy Award from The American Printed Fabric Council, 1996 & 1997 Bridal Information Resource's Retail Choice Award, 1999 DEBI Lifetime Achievement Award, McClintock also received the California Excellence Award, California Mart's California Designer of the Year Award, two Lifetime Achievement Awards, an Excalibur Award from the American Cancer Society and has been repeatedly mentioned in the list of Working Women's Top 50 Women Business Owners since the year 1994. McClintock has also been granted a Doctorate of Humane Letters given by the Academy of Arts in San Francisco.

References 

American fashion designers
American women fashion designers
American chief executives of fashion industry companies
American company founders
American women company founders
American women chief executives
1930 births
2021 deaths
Businesspeople from San Francisco
California people in fashion
Clothing retailers of the United States
Retail companies based in California
Clothing companies established in 1981
Retail companies established in 1981
1981 establishments in California
Companies based in San Francisco
Boston University alumni
San Jose State University alumni
20th-century American businesspeople
20th-century American businesswomen
21st-century American women